A note is a string of text placed at the bottom of a page in a book or document or at the end of a chapter, volume, or the whole text. The note can provide an author's comments on the main text or citations of a reference work in support of the text.

Footnotes are notes at the foot of the page while endnotes are collected under a separate heading at the end of a chapter, volume, or entire work. Unlike footnotes, endnotes have the advantage of not affecting the layout of the main text, but may cause inconvenience to readers who have to move back and forth between the main text and the endnotes.

In some editions of the Bible, notes are placed in a narrow column in the middle of each page between two columns of biblical text.

Numbering and symbols 
In English, a footnote or endnote is normally flagged by a superscripted number immediately following that portion of the text the note references, each such footnote being numbered sequentially. Occasionally, a number between brackets or parentheses is used instead, thus: [1], which can also be superscripted.

Typographical devices such as the asterisk (*) or dagger (†) may also be used to point to notes; the traditional order of these symbols in English is *, †, ‡, §, ‖, ¶. Other symbols, including the #, Δ, ◊, ↓, and ☞, have also been used. In documents like timetables, many different symbols, letters, and numbers may refer the reader to particular notes.

In CJK languages, written with Chinese characters, the symbol ※ (called reference mark;) is used for notes and highlighting, analogously to the asterisk in English.

Academic usage 
Notes are most often used as an alternative to long explanations, citations, comments, or annotations that can be distracting to readers. Most literary style guidelines (including the Modern Language Association and the American Psychological Association) recommend limited use of foot- and endnotes. However, publishers often encourage note references in lieu of parenthetical references. Aside from use as a bibliographic element, notes are used for additional information, qualification or explanation that might be too digressive for the main text. Footnotes are heavily utilized in academic institutions to support claims made in academic essays covering myriad topics.

In particular, footnotes are the normal form of citation in historical journals. This is due, firstly, to the fact that the most important references are often to archive sources or interviews which do not readily fit standard formats, and secondly, to the fact that historians expect to see the exact nature of the evidence which is being used at each stage.

The MLA (Modern Language Association) requires the superscript numbers in the main text to be placed following the punctuation in the phrase or clause the note is in reference to. The exception to this rule occurs when a sentence contains a dash, in which case the superscript would precede it. However, MLA is not known for endnote or footnote citations, rather APA and Chicago styles use them more regularly. Historians are known to use Chicago style citations.

Aside from their technical use, authors use notes for a variety of reasons:
 As signposts to direct the reader to information the author has provided or where further useful information is pertaining to the subject in the main text.
 To attribute a quote or viewpoint.
 As an alternative to parenthetical references; it is a simpler way to acknowledge information gained from another source.
 To escape the limitations imposed on the word count of various academic and legal texts which do not take into account notes. Aggressive use of this strategy can lead to a text affected by "foot and note disease" (a derogation coined by John Betjeman).

Government documents
The US Government Printing Office Style Manual devotes over 660 words to the topic of footnotes. NASA has guidance for footnote usage in its historical documents.

Legal writing
Former Associate Justice Stephen Breyer of the Supreme Court of the United States is famous in the American legal community for his writing style, in which he never uses notes. He prefers to keep all citations within the text (which is permitted in American legal citation). Richard A. Posner has also written against the use of notes in judicial opinions. Bryan A. Garner, however, advocates using notes instead of inline citations.

HTML
HTML, the predominant markup language for web pages, has no mechanism for adding notes. Despite a number of different proposals over the years, and repeated pleas from the user base, the working group has been unable to reach a consensus on it. Because of this, MediaWiki, for example, has had to introduce its own <ref></ref> tag for citing references in notes.

It might be argued that the hyperlink partially eliminates the need for notes, being the web's way to refer to another document. However, it does not allow citing to offline sources and if the destination of the link changes, the link can become dead or irrelevant. A proposed solution is the use of a digital object identifier.

In instances where a user needs to add an endnote or footnote using HTML, they can add the superscript number using <sup></sup>, then link the superscripted text to the reference section using an anchor tag. Create an anchor tag by using  and then link the superscripted text to "ref1".

History

The London printer Richard Jugge is generally credited as the inventor of the footnote, first used in the Bishops' Bible of 1568.

Early printings of the Douay Bible used two closely spaced colons (actually squared four dot punctuation mark U+2E2C “⸬”) to indicate a marginal note.

Literary device
At times, notes have been used for their comical effect, or as a literary device.

 James Joyce's Finnegans Wake (1939) uses footnotes along with left and right marginal notes in Book II Chapter 2. The three types of notes represent comments from the three siblings doing their homework: Shem, Shaun, and Issy.
 J. G. Ballard's "Notes Towards a Mental Breakdown" (1967) is one sentence ("A discharged Broadmoor patient compiles 'Notes Towards a Mental Breakdown,' recalling his wife's murder, his trial and exoneration.") and a series of elaborate footnotes to each one of the words.
Mark Z. Danielewski's House of Leaves (2000) uses what are arguably some of the most extensive and intricate footnotes in literature. Throughout the novel, footnotes are used to tell several different narratives outside of the main story. The physical orientation of the footnotes on the page also works to reflect the twisted feeling of the plot (often taking up several pages, appearing mirrored from page to page, vertical on either side of the page, or in boxes in the center of the page, in the middle of the central narrative).
 Flann O'Brien's The Third Policeman (1967) utilizes extensive and lengthy footnotes for the discussion of a fictional philosopher, de Selby. These footnotes span several pages and often overtake the main plotline, and add to the absurdist tone of the book.
 David Foster Wallace's Infinite Jest includes over 400 endnotes, some over a dozen pages long. Several literary critics suggested that the book be read with two bookmarks. Wallace uses footnotes, endnotes, and in-text notes in much of his other writing as well.
Manuel Puig's Kiss of the Spider Woman (originally published in Spanish as El beso de la mujer araña) also makes extensive use of footnotes.
Garrison Keillor's Lake Wobegon Days includes lengthy footnotes and a parallel narrative.
Mark Dunn's Ibid: A Life is written entirely in endnotes.
Luis d'Antin van Rooten's Mots d'Heures: Gousses, Rames (the title is in French, but when pronounced, sounds similar to the English "Mother Goose Rhymes"), in which he is allegedly the editor of a manuscript by the fictional François Charles Fernand d’Antin, contains copious footnotes purporting to help explain the nonsensical French text. The point of the book is that each written French poem sounds like an English nursery rhyme.
Terry Pratchett has made numerous uses within his novels. The footnotes will often set up running jokes for the rest of the novel.
B.L.A. and G.B. Gabbler's meta novel The Automation makes uses of footnotes to break the fourth wall. The narrator of the novel, known as "B.L.A.," tells the fantastical story as if true, while the editor, Gabbler, annotates the story through footnotes and thinks the manuscript is only a prose poem attempting to be a literary masterwork.
Susanna Clarke's 2004 novel Jonathan Strange & Mr Norrell has 185 footnotes, adumbrating fictional events before and after those of the main text, in the same archaic narrative voice, and citing fictional scholarly and magical authorities.
Jonathan Stroud's The Bartimaeus Trilogy uses footnotes to insert comical remarks and explanations by one of the protagonists, Bartimaeus.
Michael Gerber's Barry Trotter parody series used footnotes to expand one-line jokes in the text into paragraph-long comedic monologues that would otherwise break the flow of the narrative.
John Green's An Abundance of Katherines uses footnotes, about which he says: "[They] can allow you to create a kind of secret second narrative, which is important if, say, you're writing a book about what a story is and whether stories are significant."
 Dr Carol Bolton uses extensive footnotes to provide the modern reader with a cipher for a novel about the travels of the fictional Spanish traveller Don Manuel Alvarez Espriella, an early 19th-century construct of Robert Southey's, designed to provide him with vehicle to critique the societal habits of the day.
Jasper Fforde's Thursday Next series exploits the use of footnotes as a communication device (the footnoterphone) which allows communication between the main character’s universe and the fictional bookworld.
Ernest Hemingway's Natural History of the Dead uses a footnote to further satirize the style of a history while making a sardonic statement about the extinction of "humanists" in modern society.
Pierre Bayle's Historical and Critical Dictionary follows each brief entry with a footnote (often five or six times the length of the main text) in which saints, historical figures, and other topics are used as examples for philosophical digression. The separate footnotes are designed to contradict each other, and only when multiple footnotes are read together is Bayle's core argument for Fideistic skepticism revealed. This technique was used in part to evade the harsh censorship of 17th-century France.
Mordecai Richler's novel Barney's Version uses footnotes as a character device that highlights unreliable passages in the narration. As the editor of his father's autobiography, the narrator's son must correct any of his father's misstated facts. The frequency of these corrections increases as the father falls victim to both hubris and Alzheimer's disease. While most of these changes are minor, a few are essential to plot and character development.
In Vladimir Nabokov's Pale Fire, the main plot is told through the annotative endnotes of a fictional editor.
Bartleby y Compañía, a novel by Enrique Vila-Matas, is stylized as footnotes to a nonexistent novel.
The works of Jack Vance often have footnotes, detailing and informing the reader of the background of the world in the novel.
Stephen Colbert's I Am America (And So Can You!) uses both footnotes and margin notes to offer additional commentary and humor.
Doug Dorst's novel S. uses footnotes to explore the story and relationship of characters V.M. Straka and F.X. Caldeira.
Terry Pratchett and Neil Gaiman's collaboration, Good Omens, frequently uses footnotes to add humorous asides.

See also
 Annotation
 Citation
 Hyperkino
 Ibid.
 Nota bene

References

Further reading
Denton, William (2014). Fictional Footnotes and Indexes. Miskatonic University Press. 
Grafton, Anthony (1997). The Footnote: A Curious History. Cambridge, Massachusetts: Harvard University Press. .
Zerby, Chuck (2002). The Devil's Details: A History of Footnotes. New York: Simon & Schuster.

Bibliography
Reference
Metadata